Felix Ever After is a young adult novel written by Kacen Callender and published in 2020 by Balzer + Bray. The story is narrated by a Black trans teen as he grapples "with identity and self-discovery while falling in love for the first time".

Reception 
Time named Felix Ever After one of "The 100 Best YA Books of All Time" alongside Catcher in the Rye, The Outsiders, and others.

Reviews 
The book was generally well-received, including starred reviews from Booklist, Publishers Weekly, and School Library Journal.

Booklist Kaitlin Connor noted, "Felix's hard-fought and dramatic journey toward self-discovery will resonate with teens looking for narratives about diverse LGBTQIA characters learning to love themselves." Amanda MacGregor, writing for the School Library Journal, praised the book's diverse cast of characters and the protagonist MacGregor calls "achingly relatable". The Publishers Weekly said Callender created "an exhilarating cast of queer characters, many of whom are people of color, who are as relatable as they are realistic." The magazine also praised the whodunit plot and all its twists, concluding the review with an overall praise of the main character and the story. 

Reviewing for The Horn Book, Luann Toth mentioned the "sound information and responsible psychological guidance" present in the novel without detracting from the overall experience. Shelf Awareness Kieran Slattery, noted, "Callender ... adeptly weaves a poignant bildungsroman that builds suspense as, layer by layer, new dimensions of Felix's identity are unmasked with each failed attempt to identify his tormentor." Slattery continued, stating, "In a society where the lines between in-person and social media interactions blur, Callender believably captures this interconnectivity with teenagers whose identities are shaped, dismantled and reconfigured by their social media use."

Kirkus Reviews offered a negative review, calling it "an exhausting read" due to the complicated story and the "devastating episodes of self-doubt and anxiety" Felix goes through. The reviewer concluded Felix Ever After is a "trauma- and drama-filled demiboy's story that's not for the faint of heart."

Awards and honors

References 

2020 American novels
2020s LGBT novels
African-American young adult novels
Novels with transgender themes
Balzer + Bray books